Kenneth S. Kendler (born July 12, 1950) is an American psychiatrist best known for his pioneering research in psychiatric genetics, particularly the genetic causes of schizophrenia. Kendler is one of the highest cited psychiatry researchers. Between 1990 and 1998 he was the 2nd highest cited psychiatrist, and for the 1997-2007 decade he was ranked 4th by Thomson Reuters' Science Watch. He has authored over 1,200 papers and in 2016 his h-index was 126. Kendler's group was also noted for the replication of a study of Avshalom Caspi on the interaction of stressful life events and a serotonin transporter polymorphism in the prediction of episodes of major depression.

Kendler is a Banks Distinguished Professor of Psychiatry, Professor of Human Genetics, and Director of the Virginia Institute of Psychiatric and Behavioral Genetics at the Virginia Commonwealth University. Kendler is also one of the two Editors of Psychological Medicine. He served on the Work Group that revised the DSM-III, on the Task Force for DSM-IV, and on the DSM-5 Work Group for Mood Disorders.

Kendler is also interested in philosophical issues in psychiatry. Kendler co-wrote with Edith Zerbin-Rüdin, daughter of Nazi psychiatrist Ernst Rüdin, a history of Ernst Rüdin’s work during World War II.  During World War II, Rudin was a member of the Nazi Expert Committee on Questions of Population and Racial Policy who vociferously advocated the extermination of individuals with schizophrenia. However, Kendler's articles on Rudin have faced criticism for whitewashing his racist and later Nazi ideologies and activities. 

Kendler is the second son of Howard H. Kendler and Tracy Kendler, both of whom were influential academic psychologists. They named their son Kenneth after Kenneth W. Spence, the doctoral advisor they both shared when studying at the University of Iowa. Kendler is married to Susan Miller, with whom he has three children.

References

External links 

 Virginia Institute for Psychiatric and Behavioral Genetics
 Home page
 

American psychiatrists
Theorists in psychiatry
Living people
Virginia Commonwealth University faculty
American medical academics
University of California, Santa Cruz alumni
1950 births
Psychiatric geneticists
Scientists from New York City
American geneticists
Schizophrenia researchers
Members of the National Academy of Medicine